Government Colony High School Rahimyar Khan is an educational institution present on canal road near Bano Market Rahimyar Khan, Pakistan.

History
The foundation was laid by President Iskander Mirza Cabinet and inaugurated by General Ayub Khan in the late 1950s to improve the educational status of lower Punjab.

Education
Government Colony High School is a government institution, affiliated with the BISE, Bahawalpur. The national language of Pakistan Urdu is adopted as medium for school. A special section for talented students, known as Bin Qasim or more commonly as the English Section, began in 2000. Government Colony High School is a government school for the people of Rahimyar Khan. Primary schooling, Junior School and High School education is offered from 1st to 10th Grade.

Curriculum
 Art
 Mathematics
 Biology Theory and Lab
 Chemistry Theory and Lab
 Physics Theory and Lab
 Computer Information Science
 English Grammar (basic)
 English Literature (basic)
 Islamic Studies (compulsory)
 Pakistan Studies (compulsory)
 Social Studies (reciprocal compulsory subject for Islamic studies for non-Muslims)
 Urdu Grammar
 Urdu Literature
 Woodwork
 Electricity
 Arabic (basic grammar)
 Agriculture (basic)

Facilities
 Playgrounds
 IT library
 Library
 Science Lab

See also
 Rahim Yar Khan
 Shaikh Zayed Medical College, Rahim Yar Khan

References

External links
 City website

Educational institutions established in 1955
Schools in Punjab, Pakistan
1955 establishments in Pakistan